Szőlősardó is a village in Borsod-Abaúj-Zemplén County in northeastern Hungary. It was the birthplace of Belá Ervin Graf und Freiherr von Bothmer zu Schwegerhoff.

References

Populated places in Borsod-Abaúj-Zemplén County